Bernard Anício Caldeira Duarte (born 8 September 1992), better known as Bernard and Bernard Duarte, is a Brazilian professional footballer who plays for Super League Greece club Panathinaikos. A left-sided player, he is known for his pace and technical ability.

Born in Belo Horizonte, Bernard began his professional career with hometown club Atlético Mineiro, where he won the 2013 Copa Libertadores. He then moved for a reported €25 million fee to Shakhtar Donetsk, where he won three Ukrainian Premier League titles. In 2018, he joined Everton on a free transfer.

Bernard made his international debut for Brazil in 2012 and was in the squads that won the 2013 FIFA Confederations Cup and reached the 2014 FIFA World Cup semi-finals on home soil.

Club career

Atlético Mineiro 
Bernard started his footballing career in 2006, joining Atlético Mineiro's youth system, but was released twice because of his short height. In 2010, he was loaned to Democrata FC (back then, a club which was made up entirely of Atlético Mineiro's youth players), to play in Campeonato Mineiro Segunda Divisão (third level).

After being the top goalscorer at Democrata (14 goals in only 16 games), Bernard returned to Atlético. Despite being young enough to play in Copa São Paulo de Juniores, he was called up by the manager Dorival Júnior to play for first team.

He made his debut with the club in the match against Uberaba, on 23 March 2011, playing in the right back position due to the squad's injury crisis at the time. He then returned to youth squads, scoring the winning goal of the Taça Belo Horizonte de Juniores.

After Dorival's dismissal and the appointment of Cuca, Bernard returned to the first team squad. On 21 May, he made his Série A debut, against Atlético Paranaense. In his first season, Bernard appeared 23 times for Galo (19 starts, 1794 minutes overall). On 14 September, Atlético's president Alexandre Kalil rejected a £3.4 million bid from Al Ahli Doha.

He scored his first professional goal on 29 January 2012, against Boa Esporte. He then scored again against Caldense on 11 February, and twice against América-MG on 13 May, Campeonato Mineiro's final. His first Série A goal came on 23 June, in a 5–1 routing against Náutico. He finished the season with 36 appearances (all starts, 3100 minutes overall), scoring eleven times, leading the club (along with Ronaldinho and Jô) to a second-place finish in the league. Bernard also won Brasileirão's Best Newcomer.

In December, Spartak Moscow had an £9.8 million offer rejected by Alexandre Kalil.

On 30 July 2013 Atletico Mineiro President Alexandre Kalil accepted an offer of £22 million from Ukrainian club Shakhtar Donetsk. However, the player's agent and father revealed his son had his heart set on joining FC Porto, although, Kalil revealed Shakhtar were the only club to submit an offer for the player.

Shakhtar Donetsk 

On 8 August 2013 Shakhtar Donetsk announced the signing of Bernard on a five-year deal for a reported €25 million. He made his debut for the Ukrainian side on 31 August, coming on as a substitute for Douglas Costa, in the 1–1 draw with FC Metalist Kharkiv.

Bernard was chosen as one of the top 11 South American players 2013 by the Spanish newspaper El País.

Commenting on the 2014 Ukrainian Revolution, Bernard stated that he was willing to leave Shakhtar if the situation intensified, and had made arrangements for a potential emergency exit. His contract expired at the end of the 2017–18 season, and he became a free agent.

Everton 
Bernard joined English club Everton on 9 August 2018, signing a four-year deal with the Premier League side. Manager Marco Silva ignored concerns over Bernard's height and physicality, instead signing him for his technical ability. He made his debut on 25 August in a 2–2 draw at AFC Bournemouth, replacing Theo Walcott for the final five minutes.

He scored his first goal for Everton on 5 January 2019 in a 2–1 FA Cup win over Lincoln City in the 3rd round. He then scored his first Premier League goal on 30 March 2019 in a 0–2 victory against West Ham United. On 10 February 2021, he scored the winning goal in a 5–4 win over Tottenham Hotspur after extra-time in the 2020–21 FA Cup 5th round tie.

Sharjah 
On 22 July 2021, Bernard signed a two-year deal with UAE Pro League club Sharjah for a reported fee of €1 million.

Panathinaikos 
On 21 August 2022, Super League Greece club Panathinaikos announced the signing of Bernard. He made his debut on 11 September in a league match against AEK Athens, coming on as a second-half substitution in a 2–1 win.

International career 

Bernard was first called up for Brazil on 11 September 2012, to the Superclásico de las Américas, by coach Mano Menezes. He made his debut for Brazil as a 74th-minute substitute for Lucas Marques on 21 November 2012, in the 2nd leg of the 2012 Superclásico de las Américas against Argentina, where the Seleção won the title on penalties.

He was selected in Brazil's squad for their hosting of the 2013 FIFA Confederations Cup, making his first appearance in the final group game against Italy for the last 20 minutes in place of Neymar. He also came on as a substitute in the semi-final victory over Uruguay, as Brazil went on to win the trophy.

After being regularly called up by manager Luiz Felipe Scolari, Bernard was named among the final 23-man squad ahead of 2014 FIFA World Cup on 7 May 2014. He played in the opening game against Croatia as a substitute for Hulk, and came on at half-time in Brazil's second group game against Mexico, a 0–0 draw. He was then unused until his first start in a major tournament, playing all 90 minutes of the 7–1 defeat to Germany in his hometown of Belo Horizonte.

He remained an unused substitute in the third place play-off match against Netherlands, which Brazil lost 3–0.

Career statistics

Club

International 

Scores and results list Brazil's goal tally first, score column indicates score after each Bernard goal.

Honours

Clubs

Atlético Mineiro
 Campeonato Mineiro: 2012, 2013
 Copa Libertadores: 2013

Shakhtar Donetsk
 Ukrainian Premier League: 2013–14, 2016–17, 2017–18
 Ukrainian Cup: 2015–16, 2016–17, 2017–18
 Ukrainian Super Cup: 2014, 2015, 2017

International

Brazil
 FIFA Confederations Cup: 2013

References

External links 

 
 
 Bernard at oGol.com.br
 Profile at the Everton F.C. website
 
 Galo Digital 
 

1992 births
Living people
Footballers from Belo Horizonte
Brazilian footballers
Association football midfielders
Clube Atlético Mineiro players
Democrata Futebol Clube players
FC Shakhtar Donetsk players
Everton F.C. players
Sharjah FC players
Panathinaikos F.C. players
Campeonato Brasileiro Série A players
Ukrainian Premier League players
Premier League players
UAE Pro League players
Super League Greece players
Brazil international footballers
2013 FIFA Confederations Cup players
2014 FIFA World Cup players
Copa Libertadores-winning players
FIFA Confederations Cup-winning players
Brazilian expatriate footballers
Brazilian expatriate sportspeople in Ukraine
Brazilian expatriate sportspeople in England
Brazilian expatriate sportspeople in the United Arab Emirates
Brazilian expatriate sportspeople in Greece
Expatriate footballers in Ukraine
Expatriate footballers in England
Expatriate footballers in the United Arab Emirates
Expatriate footballers in Greece